The Druine D.60 Condor is a light aircraft designed by Roger Druine in France in the 1950s. Druine’s primary aim was to design a trainer aircraft for amateur construction. The Condor was subsequently made in quantity in the UK by Rollason Aircraft & Engines.

History

The first Condor F-WBIX first flew in 1956. The Condor was an evolution of the Druine Turbi, but featured an extensively revised fuselage allowing the pilot and instructor to sit side by side under a full canopy. 

Norman Jones, the founder of the Tiger Club and owner of Rollason Aircraft & Engines, had already had a number of Druine Turbulents built by his company and hit upon the idea of developing the Condor for the demands of club flying. With a number of refinements to the design, Rollason Aircraft and Engines undertook series production at Croydon Airport from 1961 as the Rollason Condor. As Croydon had closed for flying in 1959, all aircraft were transported to Redhill, where they were reassembled and test flown.

Norman Jones was keenly interested in the development of Flying Clubs and so made Condors available on favourable loan terms. To emphasise the fact that his company was entirely independent and un-subsidised, Norman Jones had painted on the rudder of one aircraft the legend "British Made - Private Enterprise and No Taxpayers Money".  

In 1973, Rollasons ceased all aircraft work at Croydon and moved to Shoreham where a single Condor was completed. A number of unfinished fuselages were sold off for possible completion as amateur-built aircraft; one of these was G-BADM, registered to Rollasons in 1972 and subsequently completed in 1994 by an amateur.

Borea in France also produced the D.61 Condor.

Variants

D.60 Druine's prototype with 65 hp CNA D.4
D.61 Druine production variant with 65 hp Continental A65
D.62 Druine or Rollason variant with 75 hp Continental A75 - 1 built by Rollason, later upgraded to 90 hp Continental C90
D.62A Rollason variant with 100 hp Continental O-200-A - 2 built 
D.62B Rollason variant from 1964 with 4" shorter fuselage and flaps - 41 completed; some subsequently converted to D.62C standard 
D.62C Rollason variant with 130 hp Continental O-240-A for glider towing - 4 built

Specifications (D.62B)

References

Bibliography

 
 
 
 
Jackson, A. J. British Civil Aircraft 1919-1972 Vol 3, 2nd Edition (reprint) 1988. London: Putnam

External links

http://www.rollason-condor.co.uk/

1950s French civil trainer aircraft
Condor
Single-engined tractor aircraft
Aircraft first flown in 1950